Zambezia: The Journal of Humanities of the University of Zimbabwe was a biannual academic journal in the Humanities published by the University of Zimbabwe from 1969 to 2005.  The journal specialized in humanities in Zimbabwe and other African countries in the surrounding region, but also included other topics of general interest.

References

External links
 

University of Zimbabwe
Publications established in 1969
Publications disestablished in 2005
Biannual journals
English-language journals
Multidisciplinary humanities journals
Academic journals published by universities and colleges